Chongqing Prison is a prison in the municipality of Chongqing, China.

See also
List of prisons in Chongqing municipality

References

Year of establishment missing
Prisons in Chongqing